Robert Douglas Hellstrom (born 9 November 1977) is a New Zealand rower.

Hellstrom was born in 1977 in Palmerston North, New Zealand. He is a member of Horowhenua Rowing Club. He represented New Zealand at the 2000 Summer Olympics. He is listed as New Zealand Olympian athlete number 794 by the New Zealand Olympic Committee. He lives in Picton.

References

1977 births
Living people
New Zealand male rowers
Rowers at the 2000 Summer Olympics
Olympic rowers of New Zealand
Sportspeople from Palmerston North
People from Picton, New Zealand
20th-century New Zealand people